Chovanec is a surname of Czech and Slovak-language origin. In both languages, it has a feminine form, Chovancová or Chovanecová. The surname may refer to:
 Ján Chovanec, Slovak footballer
 Josef Chovanec, Czech boxer
 Jozef Chovanec, Czechoslovak footballer and manager
 Milan Chovanec, Czech politician
 Patrick Chovanec, American economist
 Tomáš Chovanec, Slovak footballer
 Zdeněk Chovanec, Czech-Venezuelan racing driver

See also
 
Chowaniec, Polish surname
Schovanec

Czech-language surnames
Slovak-language surnames